Inuyasha the Movie: Affections Touching Across Time is a 2001 Japanese animated fantasy adventure film based on Inuyasha manga series written and illustrated by Rumiko Takahashi. The film is directed by Toshiya Shinohara, written by Katsuyuki Sumisawa, and produced by Sunrise. The film was released in Japan on December 15, 2001.

The film tells the story of Inuyasha and his friends confronting a demonic moth warrior named Menomaru, who was brought back to life by one of the shards of the Shikon Jewel.

The film marks the very first film for the Inuyasha series, followed up by The Castle Beyond the Looking Glass (2002).

Plot 

Half-demon Inuyasha's late dog-demon father Toga defeated a powerful Chinese moth yōkai, named Hyōga two centuries ago, but a Shikon Jewel fragment has freed his son, Menōmaru, who seeks to avenge his father's death and free the tremendously infinite power and strength of his father sealed away with him.

In the present of Feudal-era Japan, Inuyasha, and his friends, Kagome, monk Miroku, demon slayer Sango and fox demon Shippo, have just finished killing a scorpion demon. Miroku and Sango split up from the group after Sango's faithful nekomata companion Kirara mysteriously runs off, leading them to Menōmaru's cave. Menōmaru and his female minions, Ruri and Hari, begin battling Miroku and Sango, during which Ruri copies Miroku's Wind Tunnel and Hari cursing Kirara, to follow Hari as her leader. Eventually, Menōmaru curses Kagome so she turns against Inuyasha.

After the heroes are pushed away by a blast from Menōmaru and further split up, Menōmaru succeeds in accessing the demonic power of his predecessors, sealed away by Inuyasha's father, becoming a new, more powerful Hyōga, and begins to change the essence of time and space by absorbing the souls of countless people to fully merge himself with his family's demonic energy. Menōmaru's mind-control curse on Kagome possesses her, and she is forced to pursue and kill Inuyasha, who notices her wearing Kikyo's style of clothing. After realizing what Menōmaru did to her and choosing to face Kagome at the Sacred Tree, she shoots him with a sacred arrow in the same manner that Kikyo had done. Kagome regains control of herself and mourns her actions, during which Kikyo appears and forces Kagome to return to her own time.

Back in the present, Kagome walks out to see her family shrine, and the rest of Tokyo covered in snow caused by Menōmaru's curse. She goes to the tree that Inuyasha was sealed to, realizing that without a way back to Feudal Japan, that she can never see him again. She places her hand on the tree and discovers that she and Inuyasha are emotionally connected to each other through the tree and can talk to each other through thoughts. After Inuyasha pleads with her to return to the Feudal era, Kagome retrieves a piece of Kikyo's sacred arrow from the tree and shoots it into the well. She returns to the Feudal era to find Inuyasha reawakened, thanks to Shippo, Myoga, and Kaede.

Deciding to face off Menōmaru and his minions alone, Miroku defeats Ruri in a duel with their wind tunnels, and Sango brings Kirara back to her senses, allowing them to defeat Hari. They join Inuyasha, Kagome and Shippo in a last stand against Menōmaru. Inuyasha combines his Backlash Wave with Kagome's sacred arrow to kill Hyōga.

Voice cast

Production
Katsuyuki Sumisawa and Kaoru Wada from the television series wrote the screenplay and composed the music respectively at Sunrise, while directed by Toshiya Shinohara, and animator Hideyuki Motohashi acted as a character designer and chief animation director for the film. Unlike the television series, which was character designed by Yoshihito Hishinuma, Motohashi modeled the characters very close to original creator and mangaka Rumiko Takahashis art style.

The theme song, "No More Words" is performed by Ayumi Hamasaki.

Release
The film was released in Japanese theaters on December 15, 2001.

Notes

References

External links 
 
 

2001 anime films
Demons in film
Films based on works by Rumiko Takahashi
Films set in feudal Japan
Affections Touching Across Time
Japanese animated fantasy films
2000s Japanese-language films
Viz Media anime
Films scored by Kaoru Wada

ja:犬夜叉 (映画)#犬夜叉 時代を越える想い